Nothodiplax dendrophila, the canopy skimmer, is a species of dragonfly in the family Libellulidae. It is endemic to Suriname. Its natural habitat is gallery forest with adults occasionally flying down to low bank vegetation of sand-bottomed streams.

References

Libellulidae
Endemic fauna of Suriname
Odonata of South America
Taxonomy articles created by Polbot